In enzymology, a D-proline reductase (dithiol) is an enzyme that catalyzes the chemical reaction

5-aminopentanoate + lipoate  D-proline + dihydrolipoate

Thus, the two substrates of this enzyme are 5-aminopentanoate and lipoate, whereas its two products are D-proline and dihydrolipoate.

This enzyme belongs to the family of oxidoreductases, specifically those acting on X-H and Y-H to form an X-Y bond with a disulfide as acceptor.  The systematic name of this enzyme class is 5-aminopentanoate:lipoate oxidoreductase (cyclizing). This enzyme participates in arginine and proline metabolism.  It employs one cofactor, pyruvate.

References

 
 
 

EC 1.21.4
Pyruvate enzymes
Enzymes of unknown structure